The following is a list of affiliates with the former ACC Network, an ad hoc syndicated sports network operated by Raycom Sports and featuring the athletic teams of the Atlantic Coast Conference. This network is not to be confused with the ACC Network linear channel (announced on July 21, 2016 by the league and ESPN) which launched in 2019. The stations listed below include all stations that broadcast the syndication package.
 
Note: The ACC men's basketball tournament was not broadcast by ACC Network affiliates outside the ACC's geographical footprint as ESPN, ESPN2, and ESPNU have rights to that tournament in areas outside the ACC footprint. The ESPN, ESPN2, and ESPNU broadcasts of the tournament are no longer blacked out in areas inside the ACC's footprint, which as of 2014, includes North Carolina, South Carolina, Georgia, Kentucky, Indiana, Florida, Virginia, Maryland, Washington, D.C., Delaware, Pennsylvania, New York, Maine, Vermont, New Hampshire, Massachusetts, Rhode Island, and Connecticut.

The current ACC Network included:

 35 CW affiliates (including WTTO in Birmingham, WCCT in Hartford, WTOG in Tampa, WUPA in Atlanta, WNOL in New Orleans, WKBD in Detroit, KPLR in St. Louis and KMYS in San Antonio)
 32 MyNetworkTV affiliates (including WUXP in Nashville, WDCA in Washington, WNDY in Indianapolis, WUAB in Cleveland, and WCGV in Milwaukee)
 19 independent stations (including WLNY in New York, KDOC in Los Angeles, and KTXA in Dallas)
 11 CBS affiliates (including WFOR in Miami, WJZ in Baltimore and WBTV in Charlotte)
 10 NBC affiliates (including WRAL in Raleigh, WAVE in Louisville and WVIR in Charlottesville)
 9 ABC affiliates (including WHAS in Louisville, WPVI in Philadelphia and WTAE in Pittsburgh)

Affiliates
These were the official ACC Network affiliates throughout the United States.

Internet
All ACC Network broadcast games are also streamed on the internet via ESPN's online-exclusive streaming service ESPN3, which is available only to current cable and satellite TV subscribers.

Other
Some select games are also broadcast on the AFN Sports division of the American Forces Network serving fans who are serving in the United States Armed Forces.

See also
Raycom Sports 
ACC Network (TV channel)
ESPN

References

External links
Atlantic Coast Conference 
Raycom Sports
ACC Network - Raycom Sports

ACC